William "Billy Bob" Faulkingham is an American politician and fisherman who has served in the Maine House of Representatives from the 12th district since 2022. A Republican, Faulkingham is the Minority Leader of the lower house, and previously served in the 136th district from 2018 to 2022.

Education and career 
Faulkingham began lobster fishing with his father at age three.
He obtained a certificate in plumbing from the Southern Maine Technical College and served in the United States Marine Corps from 1999 to 2002. Faulkingham is currently a self-employed fisherman.

In 2018, Faulkingham was elected to the Maine House of Representatives from the 136th district, and has served there since. In 2022, he ran for the 12th district, winning 2,725 (60.4%) against Independent candidate Roy Gott's 1,787 (39.6%). He was also was elected House minority leader by fellow Republicans. He was sworn in as both on December 7, 2022.

Bruce Poliquin advertisement
Faulkingham appeared in a television advertisement for former Republican congressman Bruce Poliquin's 2022 campaign to regain his former seat, in which he criticized incumbent Democrat Jared Golden. In the advertisement, he was not identified as a Republican state legislator seeking reelection, which became the subject of criticism. Poliquin's campaign said doing so was necessary in order to comply with Maine campaign finance laws with regard to Faulkingham's campaign.

Personal life 
Faulkingham is a resident of Winter Harbor, Maine. He is married to Carrie Faulkingham, and the couple have 3 children.

Legal issues 
Faulkingham was convicted of assault in 2000 and plead guilty to criminal mischief and disorderly conduct. In 2003, he was convinced of throwing a bucket of human feces at other people. He was found guilty of driving under the influence in 2008.

Electoral history

Notes

References

External links 
Billy Bob Faulkingham on Ballotpedia
 Project Vote Smart – Representative William Faulkingham profile
Maine House of Representatives profile
Maine House Republicans profile

21st-century American politicians
American fishers
Living people
Maine Republicans
Minority leaders of the Maine House of Representatives
People from Hancock County, Maine
Southern Maine Community College alumni
Year of birth missing (living people)